Judo in France is the one of the most popular sports in the Country. The French Judo Federation is the national governing body for Judo in France.

History

Moshé Feldenkrais was the first man to introduce the sport into the country. Besides Japan no other country has won more medals in Judo at the Olympics.

References